Guilford is a town in Windham County, Vermont, United States. The town was named for Francis North, 1st Earl of Guilford. The population was 2,120 at the 2020 census.

Geography 

Demographics

As of the census of 2010, there were 2,121 people, 902 households, and 574 families residing in the town. The racial makeup of the town was 97.2% White, 0.5% African American, 0.0% Native American, 0.2% Asian, 0.6% from other races, and 1.5% from two or more races. Hispanic or Latino of any race were 1.1% of the population.

There were 902 households, out of which 25.3% had children under the age of 18 living with them, 49.9% were husbands and wives living together, 8.3% had a female householder with no husband present, and 5.4% had a male householder with no wife present. 36.4% of all households were non-families, and 27.1% of all households were made up of individuals. The average household size was 2.35 and the average family size was 2.85.

In the town, the population was spread out, with 22.2% 19 years old or younger, 3.9% from 20 to 24, 23.0% from 25 to 44, 37.7% from 45 to 64, and 14.2% who were 65 years of age or older. The median age was 46.3 years. For every 100 females, there were 99.9 males.

The median income for a household in the town was $57,674, and the median income for a family was $66,563. Full-time working males had a median income of $42,250 versus $31,725 for females. The per capita income for the town was $28,612. About 2.9% of families and 7.6% of the population were below the poverty line, including 12.2% of those under the age of 18 and 2.5% of those 65 and older.

Historical timeline 

 1732 – Chartered as Gallup's Canada, Massachusetts
 1754 – Chartered as Guilford, New Hampshire
 1758 – Chartered as Guilford, New York
 1760 or 1761 – First settler arrives, either Lucy Terry (1760) or Michah Rice (1761)
 1782 – First house and barn built in Guilford burn down
 1791 – Chartered as Guilford, Vermont
 1791-1820 – Guilford is most populous town in Vermont
 1816 – First Episcopal church in Vermont built in Guilford, Christ Church
 1817 – Broad Brook House built, now houses the Guilford Country Store
 1820 – East Guilford Cotton Mill on Bee Barn Road burns down
 1822 – First Guilford Town Hall built on Guilford Center Road in Guilford Center, now historical museum
 1837 – Universalist church built in Guilford Center
 1855 – Algiers (East Guilford) schoolhouse burns down
 1884 – Broad Brook Grange Hall #151 built in Guilford Center
 1885 – Green River Paper Mill burns down
 1889 – East Guilford Grist Mill, first mill built in Guilford, burns down
 1900 – Post offices close after establishment of RFD 3
 1934 – Barn burns down on Yeaw Road, killing two young girls
 1948 – Guilford Recreation Club organized
 1949 – Broad Brook Fire Control organized
 1949 – Broad Brook Fire Control becomes Guilford Volunteer Fire Department
 1954 – First firehouse built in Algiers on Guilford Center Road
 1957 – Guilford Central School built, all old schoolhouses closed
 1970 – House burns down on Johnson Pasture Drive, killing four people
 1972 – Guilford Town Hall built on School Road
 2005 – New firehouse built on Guilford Center Road in Algiers
 2007 – Town constable given police cruiser, a step toward a town Police Department
 2007 – First full-time firefighter in Guilford

Notable people 

 Benjamin Carpenter, Lieutenant Governor, buried in West Guilford's Carpenter Cemetery
 James Elliot, author and United States Representative from Vermont
 Halbert S. Greenleaf, former US Congressman from New York
Christopher Hitchens, writer, was Olivia Wilde's babysitter for a time
 Jonathan Hunt, former Lieutenant Governor of Vermont and early landowner in Guilford
 Charles E. Phelps, US Army brigadier general; Medal of Honor recipient; US congressman for Maryland
 John W. Phelps, brigadier general in the American Civil War and abolitionist
 Rudolf Serkin, Austrian pianist
 John Shepardson, one of the first white settlers of Guilford. Soldier in the American Revolution, justice of the Vermont Supreme Court
 Lucy Terry, African-American poet
 Royall Tyler, playwright
 Olivia Wilde, actress.

References

Further reading
Wheatley, Phillis; Carretta, Vincent (ed.) Phylis Wheatley, Complete Writings New York: Penguin, 2001. p. 199

External links

 Town of Guilford Website

 
Towns in Vermont
Towns in Windham County, Vermont
Populated places established in 1732
1732 establishments in the Thirteen Colonies